Langley Speedway is a race track located in Hampton, Virginia, United States. Langley Speedway is a paved short track measuring 0.395 miles in length. It is one of the flattest tracks in the region with only six degrees of banking in the corners and four degrees of banking on the straights.  In November 1970, it became the site of the last NASCAR Grand National Series race before the series was renamed the Winston Cup. The track is located in front of NASA's Langley Research Center on Commander Sheppherd Boulevard. 

The track is NASCAR sanctioned and participates in the NASCAR Advance Auto Parts Weekly Series, which determines a national champion for the NASCAR sanctioned local tracks. The track hosts 11 divisions that alternate running during their Saturday night program: 
Late models,
grand stock,
modifieds,
legends cars,
super street,
UCAR,
pro six,
super trucks,
HRKC Pro Winged Champ Karts, and
enduros.

Pre race ceremonies for the regular Saturday night events begin at approximately 7:00 PM with the first race of the night beginning about 15 minutes later. 

Langley also hosts the Hampton Roads Kart Club races on most Sundays during the season, and Wacky Wednesday which allows anyone with a helmet and a street legal car to participate in the time attack, burnout competition, and one on one drag races on most Wednesday nights during the season.

Special events

Hampton Heat 200 
Overview:
The Hampton Heat 200 is a 200-lap race for the Crossroads Fuel Late Model Stock Car Division with a large purse provided by the City of Hampton, Virginia and is the second race in the Virginia Triple Crown. The race was run according to the NASCAR Late Model Stock Car Rule Book and high ranking NASCAR Whelen All American Series officials were brought in to ensure all cars strictly fit the technical regulations. The race was separated into two halves; the first 100 laps are divided from the second 100 laps by a 10-minute break which allowed teams to put more fuel in the car, make setup changes, and rotate the tires. However, they are not allowed to change tires during the break. Contrary to typical late model races at Langley, they do count caution laps during this race.

2008:
Run on July 12, 2008, the inaugural running of the race featured a field of 25 cars with drivers from Virginia and North Carolina. Danny Edwards Jr. won the pole for the event during the Friday qualifying session with a 16.049-second lap. C.E. Falk III and Edwards Jr. raced for the lead in the early stages of the race, but Edwards took control of the race and led to the halfway mark. There were a number of early incidents that led to a few drivers dropping out before the halfway point, but the second half ran green most of the way. Midway through the second half Nick Smith started to show his speed and passed Edwards Jr. for the lead; he extended that to a dominating lead in the late stages of the race. Driving James Long's number 21 car, Nick Smith picked up the $15,000 check for winning the event.

2009:
Run on July 11, 2009, the 2009 race saw more cars than the previous year at 27. Nick Smith scored the pole for the race earlier in the day with a 16.346-second lap, merely 0.005 seconds ahead of the second-place car of C.E. Falk III. Smith, now driving for Dave Atkinson, was riding a wave of momentum as the defending race winner and from winning the Bailey's 200 late model race at South Boston Speedway the week before. Smith led the race until lap 22 when  Falk III took the lead and held it through the halfway break. Smith's race ended on lap 134 when he and Danny Edwards Jr. made contact going into turn one while racing for third.  Edwards Jr. continued on, but Smith spun collecting the 27 car of Greg Edwards. Falk held the lead until lap 183 when Woody Howard took the lead and held it to the checkered flag. Howard netted the $10,000 winner's check in the number 21 car owned by James Long, putting the same car owner in victory lane as the year before, but with a different driver.

2010:
Run on July 10, 2010, the 2010 edition of Langley Speedway's richest race began under ominous conditions with short lived showers stopping practice a couple of times early in the afternoon. However, the skies eventually cleared before qualifying began, which saw 23 entrants set times. Former Hampton Heat winner Nick Smith had returned with yet another car owner to attempt the race, but suffered a mechanical failure on his first qualifying lap and did not race. Paul DeBolt set the fastest time of 16.140 seconds, ahead of C.E. Falk, Greg Edwards, Stacy Puryear, and Woody Howard who filled out the top five. The first half of the race featured some early excitement with Falk shoving DeBolt out of the way on lap 13 to take the lead, as well as a heated battle between Stacy Puryear and Mark Wertz that had a lot of bumping  and close calls. The first half of the race went caution free until lap 100 when the caution was displayed for the half way break which allowed teams to rotate tires, add fuel, and make adjustments. Falk held the lead through lap 100 and claimed a $100 bonus for being the half way leader. During the break  Puryear was interviewed about the on track contact with Wertz which revealed a bit of a pay back may have been in order. The race resumed with all drivers in the same positions they were in at lap 100 and immediately was back under the caution flag as a pile up in turn one damaged the cars of Dean Shiflett and Eddie Johnson, and forced Duane Shreeves out of the race. Once resuming the race it was not long before the caution came out again when Puryear and Wertz bumped again, resulting in Wertz spinning in turn four. Wertz drove up alongside Puryear under caution to voice his displeasure, but nothing more occurred between the two during the remainder of the race. The race continued on another long green flag run during which Falk began to show his dominance, pulling out to a big lead. The dynamic of the race changed quickly with only a few laps to go when Rick Gdovic went for a spin on the backstretch bringing out the final caution of the race. There were less than 10 laps to which meant the cars  lined up in single file for the restart instead of the double file restarts used in the first 190 laps. DeBolt attempted to close in on  Falk on the restart but Falk got a better restart and was not strongly challenged in the final sprint to the checkers. Falk picked up the $10,000 winner's check.

Notable drivers 
Although NASCAR's premier division has not raced at the track since 1970 it continues to play an integral part in the NASCAR family with several young drivers cutting their teeth on this track every year in the many late model events.  Some of the better known graduates include:

 Denny Hamlin – 2016 Daytona 500 winner and Cup Series regular (1997 mini stock track champion)
 Joe Falk – Cup Series team owner was the 1976 Winston Racing track champion at Langley Speedway, and finished second in the Virginia State NASCAR Late Model Sportsman Division.
 C.E. Falk –  Son of former NASCAR competitor Eddie Falk and nephew of current team owner Joe Falk

Tragedy

On August 28, 2004 Dale Lemonds was killed in an INEX Legends car race at the track. Three days prior he had signed an agreement to purchase the track from  owner Wayne Wyatt. Lemonds' wife Sandy honored the agreement and followed through with purchasing the track. She later renamed victory lane to "Dale Lemonds Victory Lane" in honor of her deceased husband. 64-year-old veteran driver Shawn Balluzzo died in a crash at Langley Speedway on Turn 2 the night of July 11, 2020.  Balluzzo was the winningest driver in the history of the tracks modified division, having amassed 11 Modified championships at the speedway.  In 1980, one spectator was killed while watching a race.

NASCAR Grand National history 
There were nine NASCAR Grand National events at Langley from 1964 to 1970. The track surface was dirt at the time. David Pearson has the most Grand National victories at Langley with three.  The November 1970 season ending Tidewater 300 made its way into a unique place in the history of NASCAR.  It was the final Grand National race before the series title was changed to Winston Cup.  Bobby Allison won the race, while Bobby Isaac won the championship.

NASCAR Busch Series events 
There were 14 NASCAR Busch Series events held at the track between 1982 and 1988. The track had been paved with asphalt since the last Grand National race was held there in 1970.  Two drivers dominated the Busch Series events: Jack Ingram claimed four victories, and Tommy Ellis won five.

References

External links
Langley Speedway Official Site
Langley Speedway archive at racing-reference.info
Article about Langley Speedway by Paul Schaefer
2007 Championship Article
Article on the 2009 Hampton Heat 200

NASCAR tracks
Sports venues in Hampton Roads
Buildings and structures in Hampton, Virginia
Motorsport venues in Virginia
Tourist attractions in Hampton, Virginia